The Guča Gora Monastery is a Roman Catholic Franciscan monastery in a small village Guča Gora east of Travnik in Bosnia and Herzegovina. In the mid-19th century Bosnian Franciscans decided to build the monastery in the area of Travnik. On May 30, 1859, the General Minister of the Franciscan Order issued the decree establishing the Guča Gora Monastery.

The monastery was damaged and vandalised by mujahideen fighters in June 1993.

See also
 Franciscan Province of Bosna Srebrena

References

External links
Samostan Guča Gora 

Franciscan monasteries in Bosnia and Herzegovina
19th-century Christian monasteries
19th-century Roman Catholic church buildings in Bosnia and Herzegovina